Kenny D'Aquila is an American actor, writer, producer, and singer.

Personal life 
D'Aquila was born in Old Saybrook, Connecticut with his parents and three brothers. During high school, D'Aquila was a star football player, but unfortunately an injury ended his promising sports career.

He moved to Hollywood to pursue his acting and screenwriting career, where he waited tables to make ends meet.

Once he got married and they had a son, he temporarily left show business to focus on fatherhood. After his father passed away from cancer, there was a lot of tension within the family. This inspired his play, Unorganized Crime.

Career 
D'Aquila wrote, produced, and starred in the play Unorganized Crime, opposite Chazz Palminteri, in its Los Angeles premiere. D'Aquila starred as Grantaire in the 2nd National Tour of Les Misérables, also known as the "Fantine Company" which premiered at the Shubert Theatre in Los Angeles on 1 June, 1988 to critical acclaim. D'Aquila remained with the show for the duration of its 14-month Los Angeles premiere engagement. D'Aquila was asked to record his performance as Grantaire on the musical's Complete Symphonic Recording (1988), which won a Grammy Award. D'Aquila has appeared in more than 30 plays.

Selected filmography
Father Dowling Mysteries (1991)
Jake and the Fatman (1989)
Caddyshack II (1988)
Santa Barbara (1987)
Ohara (1987)
Matlock (1987)
Hill Street Blues (1987)
 Hotel (1986)
  L.A. Law (1986)

References

American male actors